Caffier is a French surname which, as a result of the asylum granted by Lutheran states in Germany to Huguenot refugees in the 17th and 18th century, is also to be found as a rare family name in Germany. Notable people with this name include:

Lorenz Caffier (born 1954), German politician
Michel Caffier (born 1930), French journalist, writer and literary critic

References

French-language surnames